This is a list of the first minority male lawyer(s) and judge(s) in North Carolina. It includes the year in which the men were admitted to practice law (in parentheses). Also included are other distinctions such as the first minority men in their state to graduate from law school or become a political figure.

Firsts in North Carolina's history

Lawyers 

 First African American: George Lawrence Mabson (1871) 
First Native American male: Horace Locklear (1972)

State judges 

First Native American males (both from the Lumbee tribe): Early Bullard and Lacy Maynor in 1954 and 1958 respectively 
First African American male: Sammie Chess Jr. in 1971 
First African American male (Resident Superior Court): Clifton Johnson in 1977  
First African American male (North Carolina Court of Appeals): Clifton Johnson in 1982 
First African American male (North Carolina Supreme Court): Henry Frye in 1983 
First African American male (Senior Resident; Superior Court): Cy A. Grant Sr. in 1988  
 First Native American (Lumbee) male (superior court): Sandy Dexter Brooks (1976) in 1989 
First openly gay male: Ray Warren around 1998 
First African American male (North Carolina Supreme Court; Chief Justice): Henry Frye in 1999 
First Native American (Cherokee) male: Brad Letts in 2000 
First Hispanic American male: Albert Diaz (1988) in 2001  
First Sri Lankan American male (district court): Roy Wijewickrama in 2010  
First Latino American male (elected): Lou Olivera in 2012  
First openly gay male (elected): John S. Arrowood in 2017  
First Yemeni American male: Rashad Hauter in 2021

Federal judges 
 First African American male (federal district court): Richard Erwin in 1980  

First Hispanic American male (U.S. Court of Appeals for the Fourth Circuit): Albert Diaz (1988) in 2010

Assistant Attorney General 

 First African American male: Walter E. Ricks III in 1973

United States Attorney 

 First African American male: Mickey Michaux (1964) in 1977

Assistant United States Attorneys 

First African American male: Henry Frye in 1963  
First Asian American male: Zeppelin Wong in 1963

District Attorney 

 First African American male: Carl Fox in 1984

Assistant District Attorney 

 First African American male: Walter Johnson, Jr. during the 1960s

North Carolina Bar Association 

 First African American male president: Cressie H. Thigpen, Jr. in 2005

Firsts in local history 

 Carl Fox: First African American male to serve as a District Attorney for Chatham and Orange Counties, North Carolina (1984)
 Walter Whitted Hoover: First African American male to serve as a Justice of the Peace in High Point, North Carolina [Davidson, Forsyth, Guilford and Randolph Counties, North Carolina]
 Randolph Baskerville: First African American to serve as an Assistant District Attorney for the 9th Judicial Circuit in North Carolina [Franklin, Granville and Vance Counties, North Carolina]
 Moses Burt Jr. (c. 1959): First African American male lawyer in Alamance County, North Carolina
 Larry Brown Jr.: First African American male judge in Alamance County, North Carolina (2017)
 Robert L. Harrell: First African American male judge in Buncombe County, North Carolina (1983)
 Jason R. Parker: First African American male to serve as the Assistant District Attorney for the 25th Prosecutorial District [Cabarrus County, North Carolina]
 John S. Leary (1892): First African American male lawyer in Fayetteville, North Carolina [Cumberland County, North Carolina]
 R. McCants Andrews (1921): First African American male lawyer in Durham, North Carolina [Durham County, North Carolina]
 Albert L. Turner: First African American male to serve as the Dean of the North Carolina Central University School of Law (1942)
 Lowell Siler: First African American male to serve as the County Attorney of Durham County, North Carolina (2009)
 George Henry Mitchell (1900): First African American male lawyer in Greensboro, North Carolina [Guilford County, North Carolina]
 John S. Leary (1892): First African American male lawyer in Charlotte, North Carolina [Mecklenburg County, North Carolina]
 Clifton Johnson: First African American male to serve as a District Court Judge in Mecklenburg County, North Carolina (1969)
 Spencer Merriweather: First African American male to serve as the District Attorney of Mecklenburg County, North Carolina (2019)
 Carl Fox: First African American male to serve as a District Attorney for Chatham and Orange Counties, North Carolina (1984)
 Mario Perez: First Hispanic American male judge in Pitt County, North Carolina (2018)
 Charles Wesley Williamson (1932): First African American male lawyer in Henderson, North Carolina [Vance County, North Carolina]
 Albert L. Turner: First African American male to serve as the Dean of the North Carolina Central University School of Law (1942)
 George Greene: First African American male judge in Wake County, North Carolina
 Nereus Deleon Smith: First African American male lawyer in Goldsboro, North Carolina [Wayne County, North Carolina]

See also 

 List of first minority male lawyers and judges in the United States

Other topics of interest 

 List of first women lawyers and judges in the United States
 List of first women lawyers and judges in North Carolina

References 

 
Minority, North Carolina, first
Minority, North Carolina, first
Legal history of North Carolina
Lists of people from North Carolina
North Carolina lawyers